Lake County Courthouse may refer to:

 Old Lake County Courthouse (California), Lakeport, California
 Old Lake County Courthouse (Florida), Tavares, Florida
 Lake County Courthouse (Indiana), Crown Point, Indiana
Lake County Courthouse and Sheriff's Residence, Two Harbors, Minnesota
 Lake County Courthouse (Ohio), Painesville, Ohio
 Lake County Courthouse (South Dakota), Madison, South Dakota